Ragusan may refer to:

 citizen of the Republic of Ragusa
 List of Ragusans
 person from any other place called Ragusa